Valentina Boni is an Italian football midfielder currently playing for ASD Fimauto Valpolicella. She previously spent three years at ACF Brescia in Serie A. She has won four leagues with CF Bardolino, and she was the league's top scorer in 2005, tied with Patrizia Panico at 32 goals.

She is a member of the Italian national team, and played the 2005 European Championship.

References

1983 births
Living people
Italian women's footballers
Italy women's international footballers
Serie A (women's football) players
S.S. Lazio Women 2015 players
A.S.D. AGSM Verona F.C. players
Sportspeople from the Province of Verona
Women's association football midfielders
Women's association football forwards
Footballers from Veneto